Emrah Tuncel (born 14 September 1987) is a Turkish footballer who plays as a goalkeeper for Adana 1954.

References

External links

1987 births
Living people
Turkish footballers
Malatyaspor footballers
Boluspor footballers
Adana Demirspor footballers
Tarsus Idman Yurdu footballers
Akhisarspor footballers
Şanlıurfaspor footballers
MKE Ankaragücü footballers
Manisaspor footballers
Kahramanmaraşspor footballers
Süper Lig players
TFF First League players
TFF Second League players
Association football goalkeepers
Turkey under-21 international footballers